Al-Duhail SC, a Qatari professional association football club, has gained entry to Asian Football Confederation (AFC) competitions on several occasions. They have represented Qatar in the Champions League on ten occasions and FIFA Club World Cup on one occasion.

History
Al-Duhail SC whose team has regularly taken part in Asian Football Confederation (AFC) competitions. Qualification for Qatari clubs is determined by a team's performance in its domestic league and Emir of Qatar Cup competitions, Al-Duhail have regularly qualified for the primary Asian competition, the AFC Champions League, by winning the Qatar Stars League or runners–up. Their first participation in the AFC Champions League was in 2012, and their first match was against Al-Ahli of Saudi Arabia and ended with victory despite that Al-Duhail was eliminated from the group stage. The following year Al-Duhail achieved a historic participation as it reached the quarter-finals and was eliminated against Guangzhou Evergrande which won the title afterwards. In 2018 in the group stage, Al-Duhail achieved the full mark and won all his matches, except for one defeat in ten matches. and for the third time in its history Al-Duhail reached the quarter-finals and eliminated against Persepolis.

In 2020 after playing two matches the competition was suspended due to the COVID-19 pandemic in Asia and after seven months it was decided to complete the competition, but behind closed doors and grouped in one country which is Qatar for West Asian groups. Al-Duhail SC as the holder of the 2019–20 Qatar Stars League title, was included in participating in the FIFA Club World Cup and the first match was expected against Auckland City but the latter withdrew due to the COVID-19 pandemic and related quarantine measures required by the New Zealand authorities, and in the second round it was defeated against Al Ahly, so that Al-Duhail SC was finished fifth place by defeating Asian champion Ulsan Hyundai. In 2021 and due to the continued spread of the COVID-19 pandemic in Asia, it was decided to establish each group in a country, and Al-Duhail group in Saudi Arabia. for the second time in a row Al-Duhail was eliminated from the group stage. On April 21, 2021, Michael Olunga scored Al-Duhail's first hat-trick in the AFC Champions League against Esteghlal in a victory 4–3.

AFC competitions

Other competitions

FIFA Club World Cup

Statistics

By season
Information correct as of 26 April 2022.
Key

Pld = Played
W = Games won
D = Games drawn
L = Games lost
F = Goals for
A = Goals against
Grp = Group stage

PR = Preliminary round
R1 = First round
R2 = Second round
PO = Play-off round
R16 = Round of 16
QF = Quarter-final
SF = Semi-final

Key to colours and symbols:

Overall record

In Asia
:

Statistics by country
Statistics correct as of game against Sepahan on April 26, 2022

Asian competitions goals
Statistics correct as of game against Sepahan on April 26, 2022

Hat-tricks

Two goals one match

List of All-time appearances
This List of All-time appearances for Al-Duhail in Asian competitions contains football players who have played for Al-Duhail in international football competitions and have managed to accrue 20 or more appearances.

Gold Still playing competitive football in Al-Duhail. Statistics correct as of game against Sepahan on April 26, 2022''.

Asian opponents by cities

Notes

References

Asia
Al-Duhail SC